, prov. designation: , is a trans-Neptunian object from the outermost region of the Solar System. It was discovered on 9 July 2013, by astronomers with the Pan-STARRS survey at Haleakala Observatory, Hawaii, United States.

Orbit and classification 

 orbits the Sun at a distance of 31.3–55.1 AU once every 283 years and 9 months (103,645 days; semi-major axis of 43.18 AU). Its orbit has an eccentricity of 0.28 and an inclination of 19° with respect to the ecliptic. The body's observation arc begins at Haleakalā with a precovery taken in August 2010, nearly 3 years prior to its official discovery observation.

Numbering and naming 

This minor planet was numbered by the Minor Planet Center on 5 October 2017 and received the number  in the minor planet catalog. As of 2021, it has not been named.

Physical characteristics 

According to American astronomer Michael Brown and the Johnston's archive,  measures 344 and 352 kilometers in diameter based on an assumed albedo of 0.08 and 0.09, respectively. On his website, Brown lists this object as a "possible" dwarf planet (200–400 km), which is the category with the lowest certainty in his 5-class taxonomic system. As of 2021, no spectral type and color indices, nor a rotational lightcurve have been obtained from spectroscopic and photometric observations. The body's color, rotation period, pole and shape remain unknown.

References

External links 
 MPEC 2016-O84 : 2014 JJ80, Minor Planet Electronic Circular, 17 July 2017
 M.P.E.C. statistics for F51 – All MPECs
 List of Transneptunian Objects, Minor Planet Center
 Discovery Circumstances: Numbered Minor Planets (500001)-(505000) – Minor Planet Center
 
 

501546
501546
501546
20130709